Edward I-hsin Chen or Chen I-hsin or Chen Yixin (5 February 1950 – 31 December 2022) was a Hong Kong-born Taiwanese politician and academic. He served as a member of the Legislative Yuan from 1996 to 1999 from the New Party.

Chen was born in British Hong Kong on 5 February 1950 to parents from Hunan. He later emigrated to Taiwan. Chen completed a doctorate at the Department of Political Science of Columbia University in New York City in 1986. He was a professor in the Department of Diplomacy and International Relations at Tamkang University and the director of the university's Graduate Institute of Americas from 2001 until 2005. He specialized in Taiwan–United States relations, Cross-Strait relations, globalization studies, international relations, and international political economics. 

Chen died in the United States on 31 December 2022, at the age of 72. He was survived by his wife, Nan Nan Huo, and two daughters. His funeral was held in Old Bridge, New Jersey.

References

1950 births
2022 deaths
Taiwanese academics
Members of the 3rd Legislative Yuan
New Party Members of the Legislative Yuan
New Party (Taiwan) politicians
Academic staff of Tamkang University
Columbia Graduate School of Arts and Sciences alumni
Tamkang University alumni
Taiwanese people from Hunan
Hong Kong emigrants to Taiwan

zh:陳一新 (1950年)